Roland is an unincorporated community in French Lick Township, Orange County, in the U.S. state of Indiana.

History
A post office was established at Roland in 1892, and remained in operation until it was discontinued in 1906. George Roland served as an early postmaster.

Geography

References

Unincorporated communities in Orange County, Indiana
Unincorporated communities in Indiana